Camayenne Sofa were one of the most influential popular music groups in Guinea, West Africa in the 1970s. They recorded on the national Syliphone label.

Discography
La Percee (Syllart)
Attaque (Syllart)
A Grands Pas

References

Guinean musical groups
Musical groups established in 1974
Musical groups disestablished in 1975